Guy is an unincorporated community in Fort Bend County, Texas, United States. A trucking company, a Shell Oil Company filling station, a post office, and several homes are located near the intersection of SH 36 and Farm to Market Road 1994 (FM 1994). The community was established in 1890 and was served by a railroad between 1918 and the 1980s.

Geography
The community is centered at the intersection of SH 36 and FM 1994. The continuation of FM 1994 to the southwest is called Vrlla Road. To reach Boling to the southwest, one must take SH 36 northwest past the Needville High School and turn left on Farm to Market Road 442. All distances are measured from the intersection of SH 36 and FM 1994.

History
The first Anglo settler in the area was Philip F. Ward in 1890. He was followed within the next four years by S. A. Beard, R. V. Board, J. G. and Frank Goth, H. Hoelewyn, R. G. Hughes, Dr. William Lowry, Sr. and Louis Wolf. A large influx of farmers into the area caused the first local school to be opened in 1897. A post office was established the next year and named for Una Guy Rowland, the disabled daughter of the first postmaster, Orr Rowland. The 1900 Galveston Hurricane caused widespread damage. The Galveston, Harrisburg and San Antonio Railway extended a line south through Guy in 1918.

It branched off the main line near the west side of Rosenberg and went south-southwest to Needville, Texas and then southeast to Guy. The old town site became known as Old Guy and was where a dance hall was located. By 1922, there were 82 white and four black children in two segregated schools. In that year, the settlement boasted a cotton gin, a garage and a general store with a post office. In 1932, SH 36 was built. Since the new road passed between Guy and Old Guy, the businesses and post office relocated northeast to the highway. The old dance hall was moved southwest to SH 36. At this time many residents worked in Damon, Texas to the south where oil, sulphur and limestone were extracted from the Damon Mound salt dome. In 1940, Guy's population reached 200. In 1944, the railway discontinued service south to Damon and the line terminated at Guy.

In 1946 the Guy School consolidated with the Needville Independent School District and by 1949 the Guy School closed. The community's population went into a slow decline from 150 in 1945 to 100 in 1966. By 1972 only 25 persons lived in Guy. In 1980, the dance hall was purchased by the George Foundation and moved to the George Ranch. The 1980s also saw the discontinuation of rail service. In the 1990s the local population stabilized around 60. Guy had 13 businesses in 2000.

Politics
According to unofficial returns, Precinct 1068 located in Guy had the distinction of having the highest percentage (90.5%) of votes for Mitt Romney of any Fort Bend County precinct in the 2012 election. Romney captured 238 votes for president while 25 residents voted for Barack Obama.

Education
Guy is located in the Needville Independent School District. Needville High School serves the community.

Gallery

References
Footnotes

Citations

Unincorporated communities in Texas
Unincorporated communities in Fort Bend County, Texas
Greater Houston